Bing & Satchmo is a 1960 studio album by Bing Crosby and Louis Armstrong that was arranged and conducted by Billy May. The album was recorded for Crosby's label, Project Records, and released by MGM.

Crosby and Armstrong worked together many times before they recorded this album, appearing in films such as Pennies from Heaven (1936), Here Comes the Groom (1951), and High Society (1956). They made several radio broadcasts together between 1949 and 1951.

The lyrics of the songs were adapted for them by a number of notable songwriters.

Eleven tracks were issued on the LP, excluding "(Up A) Lazy River" because Armstrong had recorded it for another company. Permission was granted for it to be included in the All Star Festival LP issued in 1963 on behalf of the United Nations to help refugees around the world. Johnny Mercer sings a few lines with the chorus on this track.

"Dardanella" and "Muskrat Ramble" were released as singles in October 1960. Billboard magazine commented that the tracks would be popular with "jocks".

Reception

The Billboard magazine review from 31 October 1960 selected the album for its pop spotlight and called it a "group of nostalgic tunes that provide excellent easy listening programming."

Variety said that the album "provides a lot of listening pleasure. Both are masters of their craft and know how to pack a vocal punch with seemingly little effort.

John Bush on Allmusic.com gave the album three and half stars out of five. Bush said that "Could anything but warmth and playfulness result when the two most seminal, expressive voices of the 20th century found the room to stretch out on a full LP together?". Bush reserved criticism for the vocal chorus that appears on the album.

Track listing

Personnel 
 Bing Crosby – vocals
 Louis Armstrong – trumpet, vocals
 Dick Cathcart – trumpet
 Shorty Sherock – trumpet
 Abe Lincoln – trombone
 Tommy Pederson – trombone
 Moe Schneider – trombone
 Chuck Gentry – saxophone
 Matty Matlock – saxophone
 Wilbur Schwartz – saxophone
 Justin Gordon – reeds
 Stan Wrightsman – piano
 George Van Eps – guitar
 Morty Corb – double bass
 Nick Fatool – drums
 Johnny Mercer – special effects, vocals
 Billy May – arranger, conductor
 Judd Conlon – choir contractor, choir director
 Gil Mershorn – choir, Bernie Parks, Thomas D. Kenny, Joseph Pryor, Burton A. Dole, Jack Graberman, Paul Ely

Production
 Simon Rady – record producer
 Wild Bill Thompson – choir arrangement

Reissue CD
 Will Friedwald – liner notes
 Anaida Garcia – associate producer
 Hugh Fordin – reissue producer

References 

1960 albums
Bing Crosby albums
Louis Armstrong albums
Albums arranged by Billy May
Albums conducted by Billy May
MGM Records albums